Aspen Film Society was an American film production company formed in 1976 by actor, writer, comedian, and musician Steve Martin and film and record producer William E. McEuen, with backing from Paramount Pictures. The company's films include The Jerk and Pee-wee's Big Adventure.

Beginnings
The company's first project, the 1977 short film The Absent-Minded Waiter, starred Steve Martin, Teri Garr, and Buck Henry. Written by Martin and directed by Carl Gottlieb, it was nominated for the Academy Award for Best Live Action Short Film at the 50th Academy Awards.

In the wake of Woody Allen's Annie Hall winning four Oscars at the 50th Academy Awards, Martin received $500,000 from Universal Pictures to write and star in the box office hit The Jerk, and the company gave Aspen Film Society and Martin the last cut and approval of the marketing campaign, as well as 50 percent of the profits.

Filmography

See also
 Steve Martin filmography
 List of live-action film production companies
 New Hollywood

References

American companies established in 1976
Companies based in Los Angeles
Film production companies of the United States
Mass media companies established in 1976
Steve Martin